Bryan Loves You is a 2008 horror film directed by Seth Landau. The film relates the supposed true story of the Cult of the Bryans who took over a small Arizona town in 1993. It was shot in 17 days with a budget of $25,000. It was released on DVD on September 23, 2008 by Anchor Bay Entertainment.

Plot
The plot revolves around a 32-year-old psychotherapist as he begins to suspect that the local religious cult has been murdering the town's citizens. He soon becomes sucked into a web of mysterious happenings, with the cult of the 'Bryans' being the focal point. The film uses the 'found footage' format, and claims that the film is a compilation of security footage.

Cast
 Seth Landau as Jonathan
 George Wendt as Mr. Flynn
 Tiffany Shepis as Cindy
 Daniel Roebuck as Professor Spine
 Tony Todd as The Narrator
 Bobby Slayton as The Interviewer
 Brinke Stevens as Nurse
 Jilon VanOver as Brody
 Lloyd Kaufman as Jonathan's Helper

Reception
Critical reception for the film has been mixed to negative, with Dread Central criticizing the film's lack of realism, saying "Watching “found footage” shouldn’t have the viewer asking questions like, “Why is everyone acting so overly evil?”" About.com's Mark Harris negatively reviewed the film, stating that "Bryan is mostly made up of drawn-out moments of inconsequential activity loosely tied together by a scenario that never delivers."

JoBlo.com reviewed the film positively, giving it three-and-half "Arrows in the Head", and writing that despite the film's resemblance to previous horror works such as Clockwork Orange, the movie "still feels fresh and inventive". MovieWeb called the film "a masterfully creepy ride through religious fundamentalism gone horribly awry".

References

External links
 
 

2008 horror films
2008 films
American horror films
Religious horror films
Found footage films
Films about cults
2000s English-language films
2000s American films